Nomadic is anything related to a nomad, a habitually wandering person

Nomadic may also refer to:

 Nomadic (company), an American virtual reality entertainment company
 Nomadic (Sonny Simmons & Moksha Samnyasin album), a 2014 album by jazz musician Sonny Simmons
 Nomadic Museum, a 2005 traveling museum conceived by Gregory Colbert
 Nomadic Way (1985–2012), a Thoroughbred racehorse
 SS Nomadic (1911), a tender ship used to ferry passengers the Titanic
 SS Nomadic (1891), a livestock ship owned by White Star Line

See also
 Knowmadic, Somali-Canadian youth activist
 Nomad (disambiguation)